Sakari Jalmari Salminen (born May 31, 1988) is a Finnish professional ice hockey player. He is currently an unrestricted free agent who most recently played for Örebro HK in the Swedish Hockey League (SHL).

Playing career 
Salminen played in his native Finland for Liiga clubs, Porin Ässät and KalPa before signing a two-year contract with Torpedo Nizhny Novgorod of the Kontinental Hockey League (KHL) on May 21, 2013. When his contract with Nizhny Novgorod was up, he moved to HC Fribourg-Gottéron of the Swiss National League A (NLA) for the 2015–16 season. He parted company with the club in late January 2016 and signed with the Växjö Lakers of the Swedish Hockey League (SHL) shortly after to finish the season with the team.

In April 2016, he inked a one-year deal with Jokerit of the Kontinental Hockey League. In the 2016–17 season, Salminen appeared in 56 games for Jokerit, registering 6 goals and 26 points.

With Jokerit opting not to continue their option with Salminen, he agreed to a one-year contract to remain in the KHL with Russian outfit, HC Dynamo Moscow, on September 15, 2017.

International play
Salminen was selected to the Finnish National Team that won a bronze medal at the 2014 Winter Olympics in Sochi.

Career statistics

Regular season and playoffs

International

References

External links

1988 births
Living people
Ässät players
Finnish ice hockey right wingers
HC Dynamo Moscow players
HC Fribourg-Gottéron players
HIFK (ice hockey) players
Ice hockey players at the 2014 Winter Olympics
Jokerit players
KalPa players
Medalists at the 2014 Winter Olympics
Mikkelin Jukurit players
Olympic bronze medalists for Finland
Olympic ice hockey players of Finland
Olympic medalists in ice hockey
Sportspeople from Pori
Torpedo Nizhny Novgorod players
Växjö Lakers players
Örebro HK players